The Roman Catholic Diocese of Nkayi is a diocese located in the city of Nkayi  in the Ecclesiastical province of Pointe-Noire in the Republic of the Congo.

History
 December 5, 1983: Established as Diocese of Nkayi from the Diocese of Pointe-Noire

Leadership
 Bishops of Nkayi (Roman rite), in reverse chronological order
 Bishop Daniel Mizonzo (since 2001.10.16)
 Bishop Bernard Nsayi (1990.07.07 – 2001.10.16)
 Bishop Ernest Kombo, S.J. (1983.12.05 – 1990.07.07), appointed Bishop of Owando

See also
Roman Catholicism in the Republic of the Congo

Sources
 GCatholic.org
 Catholic Hierarchy

Roman Catholic dioceses in the Republic of the Congo
Christian organizations established in 1983
Roman Catholic dioceses and prelatures established in the 20th century
Roman Catholic Ecclesiastical Province of Pointe-Noire